The Haraguchi classification is a system of categorizing posterior malleolus fractures.

Classification

References

Ankle fracture classifications
Injuries of ankle and foot